Katie Pasfield (born 25 August 1998) is an Australian figure skater. She is the 2018 Reykjavik International silver medalist, and a two-time Australian national bronze medalist (2017, 2018).

On the junior level, she is the 2016 FBMA Trophy silver medalist, the 2014 Skate Down Under silver medalist and a two-time Australian junior national bronze medalist (2012, 2015).

Personal life
Pasfield is the daughter of Michael Pasfield, a former competitive figure skater, and sister of Zara Pasfield, who is the 2012 Australian ladies' champion.

Pasfield graduated from Pymble Ladies' College in 2016 and is a student studying a Bachelor of Veterinary Biology/ Doctor of Veterinary Medicine at Sydney University.

Competitive highlights

References

1998 births
Living people
Australian female single skaters
People educated at Pymble Ladies' College